The M8 Motorway is a   tolled dual carriageway motorway in Sydney, New South Wales that is designated the M8 route marker. It consists predominantly of tunnels and includes tunnel connections to the future Western Harbour Tunnel & Beaches Link and the M6 Motorway.

The M8 Motorway comprises two sections:
Construction of this section began in July 2016 and it opened to traffic on 5 July 2020.
The extension was partially completed and opened on 20 January 2023 as part of the WestConnex while the remaining section between Leichhardt and Rozelle will open in late 2023. 

Both of these sections were constructed as part of the WestConnex project, and WestConnex tolls are applied.

Future sections of the M8 are being planned as the Western Harbour Tunnel & Beaches Link, which will connect the M8 at Rozelle to the A8 in the Northern Beaches. Separate to WestConnex, these sections are expected to open between 2026 and 2028.

Route

WestConnex M8

The WestConnex M8 (first stage of M8) does not have any intermediate exits. However, tunnel connections to the future M6 Motorway towards Southern Sydney and Wollongong have already been built.

This section of the M8 is currently marked at two lanes in each direction, with capacity for a third lane to be added if required.

This section was estimated to have a project cost of 4.335 billion in 2015.

M4–M8 Link
In September 2022, the government announced that the M4–M5 Link will be referred to as extensions of the M4 and M8 when the link opens in 2023. The connection to Rozelle Interchange (and a further extension of the M4 and M8 route markers) will open in late 2023.

St Peters Interchange

St Peters Interchange opened to traffic when M8 opened on 5 July 2020. It was built on the site of the former Alexandria Landfill waste facility.

At the time of opening, bridges and tunnel entrances/exits to the second stage of M8 and Sydney Gateway were already completed. The final bridge of the St Peters Interchange was put in place in October 2019.

When the second stage of M8 (M4–M8 Link) opened in January 2023, the main M8 tunnels bypassed the St Peters Interchange, with the approach to the interchange becoming entry and exit ramps of the motorway.

When fully completed in 2025, the St Peters Interchange will be an interchange of five roadways, namely:
M8 towards the M5 at first stage of M8, formerly the New M5
M8 towards Rozelle Interchange at second stage of M8, formerly the M4–M5 Link
Euston Roadtowards 
Gardeners Roadtowards 
Sydney Gatewaytowards Sydney Airport, expected to open in 2025

Exits and interchanges

Toll

Motorists are charged WestConnex distance-based tolls to use the twin tunnels. The toll charge consists of:
a flagfall
a charge per kilometre
Tolls for heavy vehicles are triple of cars and motorcycles. Toll prices increase by 4% or the consumer price index (CPI) every year, whichever is greater, until 2040, after which CPI will apply.

As the M5 East and M8 are tolled under WestConnex, a vehicle travelling on the M5 East (between King Georges Road and M8) and M8 together will only incur a single toll.

History

New M5
In 2009, the government released the M5 Transport Corridor Feasibility Study, which investigated strategic options for improving the M5 Motorway corridor. The study identified a preliminary preferred option, being the M5 East Duplication, consisted of duplicating the M5 East and construction of a new connection from the M5 East at Arncliffe to Euston Road, Qantas Drive and Gardeners Road. The strategic concept for the M5 East Duplication was placed on public exhibition between November 2009 and March 2010 for community and stakeholder feedback. Feedback received was used to further develop and refine the scheme. In 2012, the scheme become the King Georges Road Interchange Upgrade and New M5 projects, the second stage of WestConnex. The New M5 would consist of separate tunnels parallel to the M5 East tunnels.

The New M5 had the potential to impact the critically endangered Cooks River/Castlereagh Ironbark ecological community and the green and golden bell frog, which are listed under the Commonwealth Environmental Protection and Biodiversity Act 1999. Environmental approval from the federal Minister for the Environment was granted on 11 July 2016 and construction commenced later that month. On 3 June 2020, M8 was revealed as the new name and route designation for the New M5, and it opened on 5 July 2020.

Route numbering

The M8 Motorway was first named in Section 300-2 of the Road Rules 2014, as amended in 2019, to be the tunnels between Beverly Hills and St Peters, and St Peters and Rozelle Interchange. The modification report for The Crescent overpass released in April 2020 showed an image of the proposed signage "M8 North Sydney", indicating that M8 is to continue from Rozelle Interchange towards North Sydney via the Western Harbour Tunnel. The official announcement of the M8 route designation in June 2020 confirmed that M8 will further continue along the Beaches Link Tunnel and connect with the A8 in the Northern Beaches.

The next section of the M8 that opened, the M4-M8 Link, is the third stage of the Westconnex project and has a long history in similar forms. It was previously known as the “M4 South” and follows much of the alignment of the Inner West Motorway which originally formed the northern end of the F6 Freeway in the 1948 Cumberland County Plan to build an inner-city bypass and link the airport and shipping terminals.

See also 

 List of highways in New South Wales
 List of motorways in New South Wales

References

External links 
WestConnex M8 - WestConnex

Highways in Sydney
Toll roads in Australia
Toll tunnels in Australia
Tunnels in Sydney